Ishøj IF is a football club from Ishøj, Denmark. The club was founded in 2017. Its first squad plays in the Danish 3rd Division. The club has more than 1,000 members. Ishøj IF started its existence in the Zealand Series in 2017.

The club was established on 20 April 2017 as a merger between Ishøj Boldklub and SB 50 Ishøj, in order to strengthen youth football in Ishøj Municipality by centralising the academies. Former players of Ishøj include Osama Akharraz, Nicki Bille Nielsen and Adnan Mohammad. In July 2017, Ishøj became a feeder club for FC Nordsjælland.

References

External links
Official website 

Ishøj IF
Football clubs in Denmark
Association football clubs established in 2017
2017 establishments in Denmark
Ishøj Municipality